The 1990 Saskatchewan Roughriders season was the 76th season in the club's 80th year of existence. Following their win in the 1989 Grey Cup, the team opened this season as defending Grey Cup champions for the first time since 1967. The team finished in 3rd place in the Canadian Football League's West Division with a 9–9 record for the second consecutive season. However, the Roughriders could not duplicate the success of the previous year as they lost to the Edmonton Eskimos in the West Semi-Final.

Offseason

CFL Draft

Preseason

Regular season

Season standings

Season schedule

Postseason

Schedule

Awards and records 
CFL's Most Outstanding Canadian Award – Ray Elgaard (SB)
CFLPA's Outstanding Community Service Award – Richie Hall (DB)

1990 CFL All-Stars 
QB – Kent Austin
WR – Don Narcisse
OG – Roger Aldag
K – Dave Ridgway

1990 Western All-Stars 
QB – Kent Austin
SB – Ray Elgaard
WR – Don Narcisse
OG – Roger Aldag
LB – Dan Rashovich
DB – Richie Hall
K – Dave Ridgway

References 

Saskatchewan Roughriders seasons
1990 Canadian Football League season by team
1990 in Saskatchewan